Cristóbal Ramírez de Cartagena was a licenciado and Spanish colonial administrator in Peru. He was president of the Audiencia of Lima at the death of Viceroy Martín Enríquez de Almanza in 1583. In this capacity, he served as head of the government of Peru (acting viceroy) for part of the year 1584. The other oidores (members of the Audiencia) were Licenciado Juan Bautista Monzón and Doctors Pedro de Arteaga y Mendiola and Alonso Criado de Castilla.

He was soon replaced in the position of viceroy by Fernando Torres de Portugal y Mesía.

References

Viceroys of Peru
Year of birth missing
Year of death missing
1580s deaths
1580s in the Viceroyalty of Peru